Albrechtschraufite (IMA symbol: Asf) is a very rare complex hydrated calcium and magnesium-bearing uranyl fluoride carbonate mineral with formula Ca4Mg(UO2)2(CO3)6F2·17H2O. Its molar weight is 1,428.98 g, color yellow-green, streak white, density 2.6 g/cm3, Mohs hardness 2-3, and luster is vitreous (glassy). It is named after Albrecht Schrauf (1837–1897), Professor of Mineralogy, University of Vienna. Its type locality is Jáchymov, Jáchymov District, Krušné Hory Mountains, Karlovy Vary Region, Bohemia, Czech Republic.

See also
List of minerals
List of minerals named after people

References

Carbonate minerals
Uranium(VI) minerals
Triclinic minerals
Minerals in space group 2